Paulo Henrique (born 21 February 1972) is a Brazilian footballer.

Club statistics

References

External links

1972 births
Living people
Brazilian footballers
Brazilian expatriate footballers
J1 League players
J2 League players
JEF United Chiba players
Vegalta Sendai players
Eastern Sports Club footballers
Fourway Athletics players
Hong Kong First Division League players
Expatriate footballers in Japan
Expatriate footballers in Hong Kong
Association football midfielders